Many vessels have borne the name Experiment:

Naval vessels
 , thirteen ships of the Royal Navy
 , two ships of the United States Navy

Merchant vessels
 , c.1810 (unsuccessful) application of screw propulsion
  was launched on the River Thames and made three voyages for Calvert & Co. as a slave ship, carrying slaves from the Gold Coast to Jamaica before a French squadron captured her in 1795.
 Experiment (1792 ship) was launched at Leith. The British Royal Navy purchased her in 1797, used her as a gun-brig escorting convoys, and then sold her in 1802. New owners sailed her as a West Indiaman; she was last listed in 1816.
 , launched in 1798, transported convicts to New South Wales in 1803
 , was launched at Calcutta and was lost in 1807
   transported convicts to New South Wales in 1809–10
  made three voyages for the British East India Company and was lost in 1808 on her fourth
 , one of Sydney's first ferries, a paddler originally powered by four horses on a treadmill

Ship names